Tamati Hone Oraukawa (fl. 1848–1869) was a New Zealand tribal leader. Of Māori descent, he identified with Manuhiakai hapū of Nga Ruahine and Ngati Ruanui iwi. He was active from about 1848.

References

19th-century New Zealand people
Year of birth unknown
Year of death unknown
Ngāti Ruanui people
Ngāruahine people